Malcolm Webster (born 12 November 1950 in Doncaster) is an English former professional footballer who made 449 appearances in the Football League playing as a goalkeeper for Arsenal, Fulham, Southend United and Cambridge United. At Arsenal he contributed to their victory in the 1969–70 Inter-Cities Fairs Cup by making one appearance in the cup run. He was assistant manager to Chris Turner at Cambridge United between 1986 and 1988 before taking a break from football. He then became a goalkeeping coach, and has worked for clubs including Norwich City, Colchester United, Ipswich Town, Heart of Midlothian, Southampton and Crystal Palace, and also runs a goalkeeping school with business partner, Bolton Wanderers goalkeeping coach, Fred Barber.

References

External links
 

1950 births
Living people
Footballers from Doncaster
English footballers
Association football goalkeepers
Arsenal F.C. players
Fulham F.C. players
Southend United F.C. players
Cambridge United F.C. players
English Football League players
Norwich City F.C. non-playing staff
Colchester United F.C. non-playing staff
Ipswich Town F.C. non-playing staff
Heart of Midlothian F.C. non-playing staff
Southampton F.C. non-playing staff
Crystal Palace F.C. non-playing staff